The 2009 Los Angeles Galaxy season was the 14th season of the team's existence. It began on March 22, 2009 with a 2-2 home draw against D.C. United, and ended on November 22, 2009 with a loss on penalties to Real Salt Lake in the 2009 MLS Cup Final.

Squad

First-team squad
As of August 29, 2009.

(Vice Captain)

(Captain)

Off-season
The Galaxy was involved in the following off-season activity:

Draft

The 2009 MLS SuperDraft took place on January 15, 2009, with draft order determined by regular and post-season record.

Players marked with an asterisk after their previous club affiliation were contracted under the Generation Adidas program.

Statistics 
Statistics are from all MLS matches.  Ages are as of March 19, 2009 (the date of their season opener).

Last updated: September 20, 2009.

* = Not currently part of team.

Goalkeepers

Recognition 
MLS All-Stars

Landon Donovan - FW - First XI

MLS Player of the Week

Donovan Ricketts - Week 4 - SHO, 5 SVS

MLS Player of the Month

Landon Donovan - July - 1 G, 2 A, Galaxy 3-0-1 in July

MLS Goal of the Week

Landon Donovan - Week 21 - 21'

MLS Save of the Week

Donovan Ricketts - Week 14 - 14'
Josh Saunders - Week 16 - 73'
Donovan Ricketts - Week 18 - 42'

Club

Management

Other information

Competitions

Overall

Major League Soccer

Standings

Results summary

Matches

Pan-Pacific Championship

Phoenix Soccer Classico

International friendlies

MLS regular season

MLS playoffs

U.S. Open Cup qualification

References

External links 
2009 Schedule

LA Galaxy seasons
Los Angeles Galaxy
Los Angeles Galaxy
Los Angeles Galaxy